The 1977 South Carolina Gamecocks football team represented the University of South Carolina as an independent during the 1977 NCAA Division I football season. Led by third-year head coach Jim Carlen, the Gamecocks compiled a record of 5–7.

Schedule

References

South Carolina
South Carolina Gamecocks football seasons
South Carolina Gamecocks football